Nathan James Webb (born 9 July 1998) is an English professional footballer who plays as a forward for League Two club Accrington Stanley.

Career
Webb was born in Ashton-under-Lyne, Greater Manchester, and started his career playing youth football for his local side Glossop North End. He was spotted at under-15 level by scouts from League Two side Accrington Stanley and also by Sheffield Wednesday however joined Accrington Stanley in 2012 in their youth system. He was part of the squad for the two FA Youth Cup runs that saw Accrington reach the fifth round stage against Reading in 2014, and third-round stage against Crystal Palace in 2016. In March 2016, during the second year of his scholarship, he joined North West Counties Football League Premier Division side Nelson on loan until the end of the season having impressed for the under-18 side, scoring sixteen goals in the 2015–16 season. He made a total of ten appearances for the Admirals, scoring twice against local rivals Barnoldswick Town and Maine Road. In May 2016 upon his loan return, he signed his first professional contract with the Accrington on a one-year deal. In August 2016, he made his professional debut in an EFL Trophy group-stage match against Crewe Alexandra. He came on as a substitute for Sean McConville in the second half in a 3–0 defeat. In February 2017, he joined Northern Premier League Division One North side Ramsbottom United on loan. He scored on his debut for the club in a 4–0 win over Ossett Albion. In June 2017, following his release from Accrington, he re-joined Ramsbottom United on a permanent deal linking up again with manager Mark Fell, who had managed him during his loan spell at Nelson.

Career statistics

References

External links
Nathan Webb profile at the Accrington Stanley F.C. website

1998 births
Living people
Footballers from Ashton-under-Lyne
English footballers
Association football forwards
Accrington Stanley F.C. players
Nelson F.C. players
Ramsbottom United F.C. players
Northern Premier League players